The Monkees Live: The Mike and Micky Show is a 2020 live album by The Monkees, recorded in March and June 2019, during the band's successful tour. The concerts marked the first time that surviving Monkees Micky Dolenz and Michael Nesmith toured as a duo. The album is the first Monkees release following the death of Peter Tork in February 2019, and the final release to feature Nesmith prior to his December 2021 death.

In addition to hits such as "Last Train to Clarksville," "I'm a Believer," and "Pleasant Valley Sunday," and songs from the band's television show, such as "Mary, Mary" and "Papa Gene's Blues", the album contains fan favorites and deep cuts, such as Nesmith compositions "St. Matthew," "Tapioca Tundra," and "Auntie's Municipal Court." The album also includes songs from the acclaimed 2016 album Good Times!.

Additionally notable is the return of Dolenz on lead vocal on "For Pete's Sake", the closing theme to the second season of The Monkees. Dolenz originally sang the lead vocal on Headquarters, but the song was given to Tork to sing during their reunion concerts, since he co-wrote it.

The Monkees Live: The Mike and Micky Show reached No. 178 on the Billboard 200 chart. The album was released in CD and vinyl formats.

Track listing
All songs written by Michael Nesmith, except where noted.

Personnel 
Micky Dolenz – vocals, guitar, percussion
Michael Nesmith – vocals, guitar
Christian Nesmith – backing vocals, guitar
Wayne Avers – guitar, arranger
Alex Jules – backing vocals, keyboards
Probyn Gregory – banjo, acoustic guitar, trumpet, melodica
John Billings – bass
Rich Dart – drums
Pete Finney – pedal steel guitar, acoustic guitar
Coco Dolenz – backing vocals, percussion
Circe Link – backing vocals, percussion

Additional
Andrew Sandoval – producer
Christian Nesmith – recording mixer
Matthew Littlejohn – sound engineer
Dan Hersch – mastering

Charts

References

The Monkees live albums
2020 live albums
Albums produced by Andrew Sandoval